Jeleńska Huta  is a village in the administrative district of Gmina Szemud, within Wejherowo County, Pomeranian Voivodeship, in northern Poland.

The village has a population of 300.

See also
 History of Pomerania

References

Villages in Wejherowo County